The 1991 NCAA Division I women's soccer tournament was the 10th annual single-elimination tournament to determine the national champion of NCAA Division I women's collegiate soccer. The championship game was played at Fetzer Field in Chapel Hill, North Carolina during December 1991.

North Carolina defeated Wisconsin Badgers in the final, 3–1, to win their ninth national title. Coached by Anson Dorrance, the Tar Heels again finished the season undefeated, 25–0. This would go on to become the sixth of North Carolina's record nine consecutive national titles (1986–1994). It also comprised the Tar Heels' ten-year unbeaten streak that ran from the 1984 final all the way until the 1994 season.

The most outstanding offensive player was again Pam Kalinoski from North Carolina, and the most outstanding defensive player was Tisha Venturini, also from North Carolina. Kalinoski was also the tournament's leading scorer (3 goals, 3 assists).

Qualification

All Division I women's soccer programs were eligible to qualify for the tournament. The tournament field remained fixed at 12 teams.

Bracket

See also 
 NCAA Division II Women's Soccer Championship
 NCAA Division III Women's Soccer Championship

References

NCAA
NCAA Women's Soccer Championship
 
NCAA Division I Women's Soccer Tournament
NCAA Division I Women's Soccer Tournament
Women's sports in North Carolina